The Crayenborgh lecture series is the Honours Class of the history department at Leiden University in the Netherlands. The Crayenborgh was started in the 1993–1994 academic year by Dr Leonard Blussé. The concept was based on the Friday afternoon seminars at the Shelby Cullom Davis Center for Historical Studies, but Blussé decided to aim the lecture series at third and fourth year students. Twelve high-performing students are selected to participate in the twelve lectures given by experts in the field. Each year a different theme is chosen. The Crayenborgh was the first honours programme in the Netherlands.

Leiden University
Education in the Netherlands
1993 establishments in the Netherlands